George H. Klicka (born December 23, 1934) is an American businessman and former politician.

Born in Milwaukee, Wisconsin, George served in the United States Army and Wisconsin National Guard during the Berlin Crisis as a medic. He went to Marquette University and was a print ink salesman. He also owned and operated Air Clear Inc. George also served in the Wisconsin State Assembly 1967–1983 as a Republican and lived in Wauwatosa, Wisconsin. George was married to Ardath Klicka for 60 years until her passing in February of 2021. As a four year resident of Holden, MA, he is still very active in the community,

Notes

1934 births
Living people
Politicians from Milwaukee
People from Wauwatosa, Wisconsin
Marquette University alumni
Businesspeople from Milwaukee
Wisconsin National Guard personnel
Republican Party members of the Wisconsin State Assembly